Fernando Enrique Arce Ruiz (born 24 April 1980) is a Mexican former professional footballer who played as a midfielder.

Club career 
Arce came out of Club América's youth prospects, but never debuted there. Arce debuted for Irapuato in a game against Toluca on 28 October 2000. Arce played the last eleven minutes and helped preserve the 3–2 win over the Choriceros. After being relegated to the bench for most of his first year at Irapuato, Arce's breakout season in 2001 in which he scored two goals and had five assists helped garner attention from other teams. Prior to the Primera División de México Clausura 2002, Arce was transferred to Veracruz, where he remained until the following year. At Veracruz, he scored 8 goals while also dishing out 4 assists, asserting himself as one of the top scoring midfielders in the league. He was part of a Veracruz team that reached the league playoff semifinals in his last season at the club.
Selección de fútbol de México (Mexico national team)
Despite his success at Veracruz, the team decided let him go, and Fernando was transferred to Atlante before the Apertura 2003 season. In his lone year with the Potros, he scored seven goals and had seven assists, while playing in 40 games - all but one in which he played in its entirety. After the Clausura 2004 season in which he helped Atlante reach the quarterfinals, Arce was once again transferred, this time to Morelia.

At Morelia, Arce consolidated himself as a team leader, helping the team reach the semifinals during the Clausura 2005 season, while anchoring the midfield with three goals and two assists.

Before the Clausura 2008, Arce moved to Santos Laguna

For the Apertura 2011 he signed for newly promoted side Club Tijuana, right in his hometown. He won the  Apertura 2012 title with Xolos.

He scored his first goal in the 2013 Copa Libertadores with a volley and the team went on to win  0–2 against Palmeiras.

On 23 December 2013, in a friendly match against Club America he was substituted out  and his son Fernando Arce Juárez, came in as his replacement.

On 25 May 2014, Guadalajara announced Arce as their second signing for the season.

International career
Arce has also made numerous appearances for the Selección de fútbol de México (Mexico national team) under the tutelage of former head coach Ricardo LaVolpe, Hugo Sánchez and former head coach Jose Manuel de la Torre.
Against Peru on 8 June 2008, Arce scored two goals, his first multi-scoring game with the national team. Against Belize on 21 June 2008 he again scored more than once in a game with the national team.

International goals 

|-
| 1. || February 28, 2007 || Qualcomm Stadium, San Diego, United States ||  || 2–0 || 3–1 || Friendly
|-
| 2. || July 8, 2007 || Estadio Monumental de Maturín, Maturín, Venezuela ||  || 4–0 || 6–0 || 2007 Copa América
|-
| 3. || June 8, 2008 || Soldier Field, Chicago, United States ||  || 1–0 || 4–0 || Friendly
|-
| 4. || June 8, 2008 || Soldier Field, Chicago, United States ||  || 4–0 || 4–0|| Friendly
|-
| 5. || June 21, 2008 || Estadio Universitario, San Nicolás de los Garza, Mexico ||  || 4–0 || 7–0 || 2010 FIFA World Cup qualification
|-
| 6. || June 21, 2008 || Estadio Universitario, San Nicolás de los Garza, Mexico ||  || 5–0 || 7–0 || 2010 FIFA World Cup qualification
|-
| 7. || September 6, 2008 || Estadio Azteca, Mexico City, Mexico ||  || 2–0 || 3–0 || 2010 FIFA World Cup qualification
|}

Personal life
Arce's son, Fernando Arce Jr., plays for Juarez.

Honours 
Santos Laguna
Mexican Primera División: Clausura 2008

Tijuana
Liga MX: Apertura 2012

References

External links
 
 
 
 
 

1980 births
Living people
Sportspeople from Tijuana
Footballers from Baja California
Mexican footballers
Mexico international footballers
2007 CONCACAF Gold Cup players
2007 Copa América players
Irapuato F.C. footballers
C.D. Veracruz footballers
Atlante F.C. footballers
Atlético Morelia players
Santos Laguna footballers
Club Tijuana footballers
C.D. Guadalajara footballers
Dorados de Sinaloa footballers
Liga MX players
Ascenso MX players
Association football midfielders